Talcum is an unincorporated community within Knott County, Kentucky, United States.  Its post office is closed.

References

Unincorporated communities in Knott County, Kentucky
Unincorporated communities in Kentucky